Christopher Holroyd (born 24 October 1986) is an English professional footballer who plays as a striker. Holroyd started his football career at Crewe Alexandra, progressing through the club's youth system. He subsequently joined Chester City for the third year of his scholarship, and signed professional terms in 2006. In July 2008, Holroyd left Chester by mutual agreement with a year remaining on his contract.

A month later, in August 2008, Holroyd signed for Conference Premier side Cambridge United, scoring ten goals in his first season with the club. The following season, Holroyd's goalscoring form which saw him score 18 goals during the first half of the 2009–10 campaign, culminated into a move to League One side Brighton & Hove Albion for an undisclosed fee in January 2010. In September 2010, Holroyd joined Stevenage on a three-month loan deal. He was loaned out again in March 2011 to Bury, playing a handful of games. At the end of the 2010–11 season, Holroyd was released by Brighton, and was subsequently signed by Rotherham United in June 2011. He joined League One side Preston North End for an undisclosed fee in January 2012. In September 2012, Holroyd joined Macclesfield Town on loan until January 2013. On returning to his parent club, his contract was cancelled by mutual consent. He signed for Morecambe of League Two on a free transfer in January 2013, and rejoined Macclesfield at the end of the season.

Career

Early career
Holroyd began his career at Crewe Alexandra, spending five years at the club as a schoolboy, as well as a further two years as a scholar at the club's "highly rated youth academy". Holroyd left Crewe after he was not offered a professional contract entering his third year of scholarship and joined Chester City, signing professional terms in 2006 after scoring 21 goals in 28 stats for Chester's youth team in the Football League Youth Alliance. He made his first-team debut for Chester at the start of the 2006–07 season, coming on as a 75th-minute substitute in Chester's 2–1 home defeat to Wrexham.

The following season, Holroyd scored his first goal for Chester in a competitive match in October 2007, scoring a consolation goal in a 4–2 Football League Trophy defeat at Carlisle United. His first Football League goal followed later in the month in Chester's 2–2 draw with Wycombe Wanderers, scoring from eight yards to restore parity in the match. Holroyd scored his second goal of the season in a 5–3 defeat at Morecambe, as well as twice in a 3–3 draw at Accrington Stanley. He also made a further two assists towards the latter stages of the 2007–08 campaign in victories against Mansfield Town and Darlington respectively. Holroyd played 26 games in all competitions for Chester during the season, scoring five times. In July 2008, he was transfer-listed by the club in an attempt to reduce the size of their squad. A day after being transfer-listed, Holroyd left Chester by mutual agreement with a year remaining on his contract, while being linked with a transfer to other clubs. During his time without a club, Holroyd rejected the option of trialling with AFC Bournemouth.

Cambridge United
A month later, Holroyd signed for Conference Premier side Cambridge United on a one-year contract, with the option of a further year. Holroyd made his debut for Cambridge in the club's 3–0 away win at Eastbourne Borough, coming on as a 79th-minute substitute and scoring five minutes later to give Cambridge a three-goal lead. After scoring on his debut, Holroyd went sixteen games without scoring, ending his goal drought in a 4–0 victory over Salisbury City in December 2008. In February 2009, Holroyd scored in successive away victories for Cambridge, scoring from the penalty spot against Rushden & Diamonds, before scoring twice away at Kidderminster Harriers. A month later, he scored three goals within the space of three days, scoring two second-half goals in Cambridge's 2–0 win at Barrow, as well as netting against Northwich Victoria. Holroyd scored his ninth goal of the season from the penalty spot as Cambridge came from a goal behind to beat Eastbourne Borough 2–1. Two days later, he scored once more, again from the penalty spot, this time away at Kettering Town. Holroyd also featured in all three of Cambridge's play-off games, coming on as an 80th-minute substitute in Cambridge's 2–0 loss in the final to Torquay United. He played a total of 43 times for Cambridge during the campaign, scoring ten goals. In May 2009, Cambridge United exercised the option to extend the contract of Holroyd for the following season.

Ahead of the 2009–10 season, Holroyd was assigned the number nine shirt following the departure of fellow striker Scott Rendell. He started the club's first match of the season, playing the whole game in a 2–0 home defeat to Barrow. Three days later, he scored twice in Cambridge's 3–1 win against Ebbsfleet United, scoring both goals. Holroyd scored his first professional hat-trick four days later, scoring against his former employers, Chester City, as Cambridge came from two goals down to win the match 4–2. One of his goals included an audacious over head kick, 15 yards from goal. Holroyd scored four goals in two games shortly after, netting against Gateshead and Forest Green Rovers respectively. He scored a further two goals in Cambridge's 4–3 home loss to Luton Town in September 2009, taking his goal tally to eleven for the season. His twelfth goal of the season came against Cambridge's local rivals, Histon, Holroyd netting with just nine minutes remaining in a 1–1 draw. A week later, he scored from the penalty spot in Cambridge's 4–0 win against Ebbsfleet United. His fine goalscoring form continued into November 2009, scoring in victories against Kidderminster Harriers and Ilkeston Town respectively. After his goal against Ilkeston Town, Holroyd did not find the net until the end of December 2009, scoring just before half-time for Cambridge as they lost 2–1 at Mansfield Town. A week later, Cambridge United assistant manager, Paul Carden, said that he expected Holroyd to leave the club in the January transfer window. He subsequently played his last game for the club in Cambridge's 1–0 home defeat to Eastbourne Borough. During the first half of the 2009–10 season, Holroyd scored 15 goals in 25 games for Cambridge.

Brighton & Hove Albion
Holroyd joined League One team Brighton & Hove Albion on 29 January 2010. An undisclosed fee was agreed between Cambridge United and Brighton on 22 January, but the transfer was not finalised until a week later due to negotiations over personal terms between player and club. The intervening period led to much speculation that the deal had collapsed. Holroyd made his Brighton debut just a day after signing, which came as a surprise, coming on as a 64th-minute substitute in a 1–0 defeat to Millwall. Holroyd featured a total of 13 times during the latter stages of the club's 2009–10 campaign, failing to score. The following season, Holroyd found first-team opportunities hard to come by, featuring just twice in games against Northampton Town and Walsall. He slipped further down the pecking order following Francisco Sandaza's arrival at the club. Brighton manager Gus Poyet said that Holroyd "needs to play in a different environment to try and re-establish himself", as well as saying "he needs to play regularly". In May 2011 the club announced that he would be released at the end of the season following the ending of his current contract, along with five other players.

Stevenage and Bury loans
Holroyd signed for League Two club Stevenage on a three-month loan deal in September 2010. He made his debut the next day, scoring the only goal of the game in the club's 1–0 win over Lincoln City at Sincil Bank. Three days later, Holroyd scored a hat-trick in Stevenage's 4–1 victory against Hereford United, taking his tally up to four goals in two games. Stevenage manager Graham Westley said "He's lethal, we knew that before he came to the club. He's been very impressive in his two games so far, his work ethic is excellent and he is a constant menace for opposition defences". Holroyd scored his fifth goal for Stevenage in the club's 2–1 home win against Burton Albion, turning sharply in the box to restore Stevenage's lead in the second-half. Earlier on in the same game, he missed a penalty after originally being fouled in the area. Holroyd scored his sixth goal for Stevenage in a 1–1 draw against Shrewsbury Town. Due to a host of postponements, Holroyd's final game for the club was a 1–0 home loss to Northampton Town on 11 December, and he returned to his parent club on Boxing Day. During his three-month loan spell, Holroyd scored six goals in twelve games.

In March 2011, after making three substitute appearances for Brighton, Holroyd was loaned out to another League Two side in the form of Bury. His loan spell ran until the end of the 2010–11 season. Holroyd made his debut a day after signing for the club, coming on as a 69th-minute substitute in a 0–0 draw at Rotherham United. Three days later, Holroyd scored in a 2–1 home loss to Torquay United. Brighton opted to recall Holroyd on 11 April 2011. He made four appearances for Bury during his loan spell, scoring one goal.

Rotherham United
After being released by Brighton, Holroyd signed for League Two side Rotherham United on 20 June 2011. He joined the club on a free transfer, signing a two-year contract. Holroyd made his Rotherham debut in the club's 1–0 home win against Oxford United on 6 August 2011, playing 72 minutes of the match. He scored his first goal for Rotherham in a 2–0 home victory against Aldershot Town in November 2011, scoring a glancing header to double Rotherham's advantage on their way to recording their first victory in ten games. It was to be Holroyd's only goal for the club, making a total of 19 appearances in the first half of the 2011–12 campaign, of which only six were starting appearances even though Holroyd was the club's top scorer in pre-season games.

Preston North End
Holroyd joined League One club Preston North End for an undisclosed fee on 20 January 2012. The move meant that Holroyd was again playing under the management of Graham Westley, who had signed him on loan during his time at Stevenage. He made his debut a day later playing in a new position on the right wing and winning the man of the match award in a 2–0 home defeat to Leyton Orient. Holroyd scored his first goal for Preston on 21 April 2012, heading in a Danny Mayor cross at the back post in a 1–1 draw away at Oldham Athletic. In total, Holroyd made 20 appearances for Preston, where he was played mostly as a traditional right winger.

In August 2012, Holroyd joined his hometown club, Conference Premier side Macclesfield Town, on loan until January 2013. He made a scoring debut for the club, coming off the bench to score with his first touch in a 3–2 win against Lincoln City. In the fourth appearance of his loan spell, Holroyd scored a hat-trick as Macclesfield defeated Stockport County 4–3 at Edgeley Park. Holroyd scored his fifth goal for Macclesfield in a 2–2 away draw with Gateshead, coming on as a substitute and equalising late-on. He went on to score nine times in 23 appearances during the five-month loan spell, including two goals in a 4–1 FA Cup victory over Barrow that ensured Macclesfield progressed to the third round of the competition.

Holroyd returned to Preston in January 2013, and was told he did not feature in the club's plans. With his contract expiring in June 2013, Holroyd's contract was cancelled by mutual consent.

Morecambe
Available on a free transfer, Holroyd attracted the interest of Macclesfield Town, having just spent five months on loan with the club. However, no permanent transfer materialised, and, on 17 January 2013, he signed for League Two club Morecambe on a contract until the end of the 2012–13 season. Holroyd made his debut a day after signing for the club, coming on as a second-half substitute in a 0–0 home draw against Cheltenham Town.

Wrexham
He then moved to Wrexham.

Chorley
He then joined Chorley in June 2019. He made 30 appearances for the club, scoring nine goals.

Stalybridge Celtic
In February 2020 he joined Stalybridge Celtic until the end of the 2020–21 season. However, after only getting playing time in three games, he left the club on 10 September 2020.

Warrington Town
On 5 October 2020, Holroyd joined Warrington Town. He left the club again exactly one month later.

Career statistics

Honours
Macclesfield Town
FA Trophy runner-up: 2016–17

References

External links

English footballers
Chester City F.C. players
Cambridge United F.C. players
Brighton & Hove Albion F.C. players
Stevenage F.C. players
Bury F.C. players
Rotherham United F.C. players
Preston North End F.C. players
Macclesfield Town F.C. players
Morecambe F.C. players
Wrexham A.F.C. players
Chorley F.C. players
Warrington Town F.C. players
English Football League players
National League (English football) players
Association football forwards
Sportspeople from Macclesfield
1986 births
Living people
Stalybridge Celtic F.C. players